Samuel Jumpe Soares (born 15 June 2002) is a Portuguese professional footballer who plays as a goalkeeper for Benfica B.

Career
Soares is a product of the youth academies of Tires and Benfica. He began his senior career with the Benfica B in 2021. He signed a professional contract with the club on 6 October 2022, tying him to the club until 2027.

International career
Soares has represented Portugal at youth international level.

Career statistics

Club

Notes

Honours
Benfica
 UEFA Youth League: 2021–22
Under-20 Intercontinental Cup: 2022

References

External links

 Profile at the S.L. Benfica website

2002 births
Living people
People from Amadora
Portuguese footballers
Portugal youth international footballers
Portuguese sportspeople of Angolan descent
Association football goalkeepers
Liga Portugal 2 players
S.L. Benfica B players
Sportspeople from Lisbon District